Dennis Daly (11 February 1911 – 22 May 1968) was a South African cricketer. He played in five first-class matches for Eastern Province from 1933/34 to 1935/36.

See also
 List of Eastern Province representative cricketers

References

External links
 

1911 births
1968 deaths
South African cricketers
Eastern Province cricketers
Cricketers from Cape Town